The Parish Church of Urtijëi located in the town of Urtijëi in Val Gardena in South Tyrol, Italy is dedicated to  the Epiphany and to Saint Ulrich. 

It was built in the years 1792–1796 in the Neoclassical style with some Baroque elements by the tyrolean master Joseph Abenthung and the interior domes painted by the Tyrolean brothers Franz Xaver and Josef Kirchebner. 
The structure of the church has the form of Latin cross with a central nave and two lateral chapels dedicated to the Sacred Heart of Jesus and to Our Lady of the Rosary.

Artworks
The church contains a great number of sculptures, mostly in wood, carved by artists from Val Gardena, including Vigil Dorigo, Luis Kostner, Josef Moroder-Lusenberg, Anton Pitscheider and Franz Ruggaldier.  In the corners of the presbytery there are  four plaster statues, created by Johann Dominik Mahlknecht (German Wikipedia) for this church but never cast in bronze, representing the four Evangelists. 

The stained glass windows are a matching set, each one containing a roundel with the head of one of the Twelve Apostles. 

Artists represented in the church include (all links leading to German Wikipedia): 
 Ferdinand Demetz
 Jakob Crepaz
 Franz Xaver Kirchebner
 Johann Dominik Mahlknecht
 Josef Mersa
 Ludwig Moroder
 Rudolf Moroder
 Johann Baptist Moroder

Gallery  
<div align="center">
 

<div align="center">

Artworks

References
 Margareth Runggaldier Mahlknecht, Karl Mahlknecht. St. Ulrich in Gröden – Kirchen und Kirchengeschichte. Eine Text- und Bilddokumentation. Athesia Verlag Brixen 1992 (German)

Other projects

 Artwork in the Parish church of Urtijëi
 Dome frescos by Franz Xaver Kirchebner
 Evangelists by J.D. Mahlknecht

Churches in South Tyrol
Woodcarving
Roman Catholic churches completed in 1796
1796 establishments in the Holy Roman Empire
18th-century Roman Catholic church buildings in Italy
Neoclassical church buildings in Italy